Nord-Rügen is an Amt in the district of Vorpommern-Rügen, in Mecklenburg-Vorpommern, Germany. The seat of the Amt is in Sagard.

The Amt Nord-Rügen consists of the following municipalities:
Altenkirchen
Breege
Dranske
Glowe
Lohme
Putgarten
Sagard
Wiek

References

Ämter in Mecklenburg-Western Pomerania
Rügen